Aron Price (born 6 May 1982) is an Australian professional golfer.

Price was born in Sydney, Australia. He played college golf at Georgia Southern University and turned professional in 2005. Price was a member of the Nationwide Tour from 2006 to 2008. In 2008 he finished 18th on the money list and earned his PGA Tour card for 2009.

Amateur wins
2004 Rice Planters Amateur, Players Amateur

Professional wins (2)

PGA Tour of Australasia wins (1)

Nationwide Tour wins (1)

Nationwide Tour playoff record (1–1)

See also
2008 Nationwide Tour graduates

External links

Australian male golfers
PGA Tour golfers
PGA Tour of Australasia golfers
Korn Ferry Tour graduates
Golfers from Sydney
Sportsmen from New South Wales
1982 births
Living people